Lucio Pérez Velasco (2 March 1854 – 27 November 1904) was a Bolivian politician who served as the 13th vice president of Bolivia from 1899 to 1903. He served as first vice president alongside second vice president Aníbal Capriles Cabrera during the administration of José Manuel Pando. By decree of 23 January 1903. he was dismissed. A member of the Liberal Party, he was elected deputy for the Beni department in 1884. From 1889 to 1893, he was Senator for Beni.

References 

1854 births
1904 deaths
Liberal Party (Bolivia) politicians
Vice presidents of Bolivia